Long Pond is a lake located southeast of Sabael, New York. Fish species present in the lake are brook trout, white sucker, black bullhead, sunfish, and pickerel. Access to the pond via trail from road on the west shore. No motors are allowed on this pond.

References

Lakes of New York (state)
Lakes of Hamilton County, New York